

Incumbents
Party General Secretary: Nguyễn Phú Trọng
President: Trương Tấn Sang, then Trần Đại Quang 
Prime Minister: Nguyễn Tấn Dũng, then Nguyễn Xuân Phúc
Assembly Chairperson: Nguyen Sinh Hung then Nguyễn Thị Kim Ngân
Executive Secretary: Lê Hồng Anh then Đinh Thế Huynh

Events

January
January 20-28 - 12th National Congress of the Communist Party of Vietnam occurred at the My Dinh National Convention Centre, Hanoi.

August
August 5-21 - 7 athletes from Vietnam competed in the 2016 Summer Olympics in Rio de Janeiro, Brazil.

 
2010s in Vietnam
Years of the 21st century in Vietnam